Betty Schuurman (born 1962) is Dutch actress. She appeared in more than forty films since 1992 including Character which won the Academy Award for Best Foreign Language Film at the 70th Academy Awards.

Selected filmography

References

External links 

1962 births
Living people
Dutch film actresses
20th-century Dutch actresses
21st-century Dutch actresses